The American Association of Nurse Practitioners (AANP) is a North American for profit, membership organization formed in 2013 as a result of a merger between the American Academy of Nurse Practitioners (founded in 1985) and the American College of Nurse Practitioners (founded in 1995)  to provide nurse practitioners with a unified way to network and advocate their issues. The American Academy of Nurse Practitioners was the first organization created for nurse practitioners of all specialties in the United States of America, and AANP remains the largest national membership organization for nurse practitioners in the United States. AANP seeks to represent the interests of the more than 355,000 nurse practitioners licensed to practice in the U.S. and continually advocates at local, state and federal levels for the recognition of nurse practitioners as providers of high-quality, cost-effective and personalised health care.

The association has two official journals: the Journal of the American Association of Nurse Practitioners and The Journal for Nurse Practitioners.

Criticism 
The AANP's position paper Quality of Nurse Practitioner Practice has been strongly criticised for misrepresenting the available data.

Notable events
 2013 - The American College of Nurse Practitioners and American Academy of Nurse Practitioners merge to form the American Association of Nurse Practitioners.
 2020 - AANP calls on members to use social media channels to block a news story which is negative towards nurse practitioners.
 2020 - AANP states a book relating to nurse practitioners is propagating negative "conspiracy theories and misstatements".

References

External links

Nursing organizations in the United States
Advanced practice registered nursing
2013 establishments in the United States